Eriostylos is a monotypic genus of flowering plants belonging to the family Amaranthaceae. The only species is Eriostylos stefaninii.

Its native range is Somalia.

References

Amaranthaceae
Amaranthaceae genera
Monotypic Caryophyllales genera